Lubna Hamdan Taha is an illustrator, writer, and designer of Palestinian children's stories. She created several drawings for children's books with Arab publishing houses, the latest of which is the stories "Red" and "Sheep and Wool," which were published by Al-Ahlia House for Publishing and Distribution in Amman, Jordan. She won the "Etisalat Award" for children's book for the book "Mama Bint Safi" in 2018. It is one of the most essential and prominent awards dedicated to children's literature in the Arab world.

Professional biography 
Lubna Taha's drawings are distinguished by the abundance of decorations and the use of pencils and wood colors. Lubna works on the use of children's literature, with children and teachers in libraries and schools, as an educational approach that relies in its style on imagination and exploration. She has won several awards in the field of children's literature illustrations. "Mama Bint Safi," a simplified novel for children, was the writer's first published work on Dar Al Salwa in Amman / Jordan in 2018. Lubna lives in Ramallah, Palestine, and is married to the poet and writer of children's stories "Anas Abu Rahma."

Works 
• Implemented and designed graphics for several children's stories, including:

• (2019), "Kissa An Sa Wa L" (A story about S.L": "Anas Abu Rahma,): Tamer Institute for Community Education.

• (2019), "Bikuli Alhub Min Kalbi" (With all the love from my heart), book written by Anas Abu Rahma, "Palestine Writing Workshop" .

• (2018), "Mama Bint Safi": Lubna Taha, illustrations: Maya Fidawi, Dar Al Salwa, Amman / Jordan.

• (2018), "Yadan Min Aljannah" (Hands from Heaven): Amal Nasser, Dar Al Banan.

• (2019), "Yalla..!": Arwa Khamis, Arwa Arabic Publications.

• (2017), "Almuttaham Faar" (The accused is a rat): Samah Abu Bakr, Asala for Publishing and Distribution.

• (2016), "Nasaih Gair Muhimma Lil Qareh Alsageer" (Unimportant Advice for the Young Reader): Anas Abu Rahma, about the Tamer Foundation for Community Education.

• (2014), "Afkaar Fi Alharra Wa Aldar" (Ideas for the neighborhood and home), Tamer Foundation for Community Education.

• (2014), "Muthakkirat Atfal Albahar" (Memoirs of the Children of the Sea), Tamer Foundation for Community Education.

• (2014), "Heena Yaood Abi" (When My Father Returns) by Maya Abu Al-Hayat, Asala for Publishing and Distribution.

• (2014), "Diwan Kaws Kuzah" (The Rainbow Diwan): Rose Shomali Musleh, Beit Sahour.

• (2013), "Rahalat Ajeeba Fi Albilad Algareeba" (Wonderful Journeys in Strange Lands): Sonia Nemer, about the Tamer Institute for Community Education.

• (2013), "Ashjar Lil Nas Algaibeen" (Trees for the Absentee People): Ahlam Bisharat, on the authority of the Tamer Institute for Community Education.

• (2012), "Namula": Zakaria Muhammad, Tamer Institute for Community Education.

• (2011), "Kissah Kabla Alnawm" (A Bedtime Story): Maya Abu Al Hayat, Tamer Institute for Community Education.

• (2011), "Ugniyat Albier" (Song of the Well): Anas Abu Rahma, for the Tamer Institute for Community Education.

Awards 
She has won several awards, including:

 Prize of the Palestinian Ministry of Culture
 Abdul Hameed Shoman Foundation Prize
 "Etisalat" award in the writing category for the story "Mama Bint My Class" – in 2018
 "Etisalat" award in the category of the best children's book for the book "S and L" written by "Anas Abu Rahma" whose drawings she executed and designed – 2019

References 

Palestinian writers
Palestinian designers
Living people
Year of birth missing (living people)